Arthur Glacier is a valley glacier in Antarctica. It was discovered by members of West Base of the United States Antarctic Service, in aerial flights and from ground surveys in November–December 1940. It was named by the Advisory Committee on Antarctic Names for Rear Admiral Arthur C. Davis, a leader in aviation in the U.S. Navy.

See also
 Glaciology
 List of glaciers in the Antarctic
 Rea Rocks - a group of rocks in the middle of the glacier

References 

Glaciers of Marie Byrd Land